Sune Roland Adolfsson (born 11 March 1950) is a Swedish biathlete. He was part of the Swedish team reserve at the 1972 Winter Olympics. At the 1976 Winter Olympics, he placed eighth in the 4×7.5 km relay. His younger brother Ronnie Adolfsson competed in biathlon at the 1980 and 1984 Olympics.

References

1950 births
Living people
Biathletes at the 1976 Winter Olympics
Swedish male biathletes
Olympic biathletes of Sweden
20th-century Swedish people